Hampus Finndell (born 6 June 2000) is a Swedish footballer who plays for Djurgårdens IF as a central midfielder.

Career

Youth career
Finndell started out playing for IK Franke in Västerås before moving to Stockholm and IF Brommapojkarna. In 2016 he moved to the Netherlands, joining former IF Brommapojkarna player Simon Tibbling at FC Groningen.

Djurgårdens IF
On 20 December 2017, Finndell signed a four year-deal with Allsvenskan side Djurgårdens IF. On 15 May 2019 Finndell made his debut in Allsvenskan coming on as a substitute in a 3-0 victory against Falkenbergs FF.

Honours
Djurgårdens IF
 Allsvenskan: 2019
 Svenska Cupen: 2017–18

References

External links 
 Djurgården profile 
 Swedish national team profile 

2000 births
Living people
Association football midfielders
Sportspeople from Västerås
Swedish footballers
Sweden youth international footballers
Allsvenskan players
IF Brommapojkarna players
FC Groningen players
Djurgårdens IF Fotboll players
Dalkurd FF players
Superettan players